Uniao Desportiva Internacional is a Guinea-Bissauan football club based in Uniao. They play in the top division in Guinean football, the Campeonato Nacional da Guine-Bissau.

Achievements
Campeonato Nacional da Guiné-Bissau: 4
 1976, 1985, 2003, 2019.

Taça Nacional da Guiné Bissau: 6
 1977, 1983, 1984, 1985, 1988, 1996.

Football clubs in Guinea-Bissau